Fatima Khamis Salem Khalfan Al Mazrouei is a diplomat from the United Arab Emirates. On January 12, 2017, she became the first female Ambassador to Denmark from the UAE. In 2006 she was one of the first group of women to enter the Federal National Council, when she was appointed to the legislature.

Education
Master of Comparative Regional Studies American University 2008
BA in Hebrew Language and Literature from Ain Shams University - 1999
Course from the Diplomatic Institute, Ministry of Foreign Affairs - United Arab Emirates

References

United Arab Emirates women ambassadors
American University alumni
Ambassadors of the United Arab Emirates to Denmark
Emirati women in politics
Members of the Federal National Council
Year of birth missing (living people)
Living people
Place of birth missing (living people)